"Act Yr Age" is a song recorded by Australian indie rock band Bluejuice. The song was released in 2011 as the lead single from the band's third and final studio album, Company. The song peaked at number 68 on the ARIA Charts in February 2012.

The song polled at number 20 on the Triple J Hottest 100, 2011.
At the J Awards of 2011, the song was nominated for Australian Song of the Year.

The Sam Bennetts directed music video was nominated for Best Video at the ARIA Music Awards of 2012.

In September 2013, Bliss n Eso released "Act Your Age", which samples Bluejuice's track.

Reception
In an album review, Beat Magazine said "Lead single 'Act Yr Age' is an amazing slice of pop, with gem lyrics like 'I've been down so long/I got comfortable on my knees', elevate it from the mundane, lowest common denomination pop that ARIA has graciously fed us 98% of the time for the past 25 years."

Music video
The music video for "Act Yr Age" was directed by Sam Bennetts and released in October 2011. It features lead singer Jake Stone in an unexpected passionate tryst with an older woman in the park, witnessed by innocent members of the public and band members Stavros Yiannoukas, Jamie Cibej, Jerry Craib and James Hauptmann.

Charts

Certifications

Release history

References

2011 singles
2011 songs
Dew Process singles